Vahan Shirvanian (February 10, 1925, Hackensack, New Jersey – January 30, 2013, Mountain Lakes, New Jersey) was an American cartoonist, best known for his comic strip No Comment. He received the National Cartoonist Society Gag Cartoon Award in 1959 for his work.

References

External links
 Vahan Shirvanian on Lambiek's Comiclopedia.
Vahan Shirvanian cartoons on CartoonStock (Commercial site)
NCS Awards

The New Yorker cartoonists
American people of Armenian descent
American comics artists
1925 births
2013 deaths